Al Mujazzal Club is a Saudi Arabian football team based in Al Majma'ah that is currently playing in the Saudi Third Division.  Their home stadium is King Salman Sport City Stadium.

On 23 April 2016, Al-Mujazzal won its first ever league title winning the 2015–16 Saudi First Division and achieved their first ever promotion to the top flight league. However, on 21 July 2016, the Saudi Arabian Football Federation decided to strip them off their title and promotion due to a match fixing scandal and demoted them to last place in the 2015–16 Saudi First Division thus getting relegated to the Second Division.

Current squad 

As of Saudi Third Division:

{|
|-
| valign="top" |

References

Football clubs in Saudi Arabia
Football clubs in Al Majma'ah
1975 establishments in Saudi Arabia
Association football clubs established in 1975